The women's 400 metres competition at the 2018 Asian Games took place on 25 and 26 August 2018 at the Gelora Bung Karno Stadium.

Schedule
All times are Western Indonesia Time (UTC+07:00)

Records

Results

Round 1
 Qualification: First 2 in each heat (Q) and the next 2 fastest (q) advance to the final.

Heat 1

Heat 2

Heat 3

Final

 Nirmala Sheoran of India originally finished 4th, but due to the positive result of the test for Drostanolone and Metenolone, the Athletics Integrity Unit declared to invalidate all results achieved from 15 August 2016 by her.

References

External links
Results

Women's 400 metres
2018 women